Charles Albert McKinley (13 September 1902 – 20 March 1983) was an English professional football outside forward who played in the Football League for Charlton Athletic and Brentford. He remained an amateur prior to joining Brentford.

Honours 
Leyton
 FA Amateur Cup: 1927–28

Career statistics

References

1902 births
English footballers
English Football League players
Brentford F.C. players
Footballers from the London Borough of Bromley
Association football outside forwards
Charlton Athletic F.C. players
Leyton F.C. players
Southall F.C. players
1983 deaths